ULIM Chișinău was a Moldovan football club based in Chișinău, Moldova. They played 5 seasons in Moldovan National Division.

History
The team was founded in 1992, starting with the 1992–93 season the team played in National Division where suddenly took 6th place team is also winner of the bronze in season 1993–94. Last year in the top division was 1996–97 where he took 10th in financial trouble it self relegated in second division.

 1992 – foundation as FC Codru Calarasi
 1997 – renaming in ULIM-Codru Calarasi
 1998 – renaming in ULIM-Tebas Chişinău
 1999 – renaming in ULIM Chişinău
 2002 – dissolution

Achievements
Moldovan National Division
 Third Place (1): 1993–94

References

External links
 ULIM Chișinău la weltfussballarchiv.com

Defunct football clubs in Moldova
Football clubs in Chișinău
Association football clubs established in 1992
Association football clubs disestablished in 2002